Gyula Benkő (1918–1997) was a Hungarian actor and father of actor Péter Benkő.

Selected filmography
 Hungary's Revival (1939)
 Magdolna (1942)
 Dr. Kovács István (1942)
 I Am Guilty (1942)
 Szerelmes szívek (1944)
 Különös házasság (1951)
 Young Hearts (1953) 
 Guns and Doves (1961)
 Two Half-Times in Hell (1961)
 Férjhez menni tilos! (1964)
 The Testament of Aga Koppanyi (1967)
 Stars of Eger (1968)
 A Very Moral Night (1977)
 The Fortress (1979)
 The Wondrous Voyage of Kornel Esti (1995)

External links

1918 births
1997 deaths
Hungarian male film actors
Hungarian male television actors
Male actors from Budapest
20th-century Hungarian male actors